Florián Gonzalo de Jesús Monzón (born 3 January 2001) is an Argentine professional footballer who plays as a centre-forward for Almirante Brown, on loan from Vélez Sarsfield.

Club career
Monzón signed for Vélez Sarsfield in 2015, going on to score over forty goals in their academy. Mauricio Pellegrino promoted the centre-forward into his first-team squad in 2020, as he made his senior debut on 28 October in a Copa Sudamericana second stage first leg draw at home to Peñarol; he replaced Pablo Galdames for the final moments. He went unused on the substitute's bench seven times across the next month or so, prior to making his bow domestically off the bench on 5 December in the Copa de la Liga Profesional versus Patronato. Monzón's first goal arrived on 16 January 2021 versus Rosario Central. In July 2021, Monzón joined Platense on a loan for the rest of the year. On 26 January 2022, Monzón was loaned out again, this time to Almirante Brown until the end of 2022.

International career
In 2019, Monzón received a call-up from the U18s for the COTIF Tournament in Spain. He scored once, in a five-goal victory over Bahrain, as they placed third.

Personal life
Monzón is the son of Pedro Monzón and nephew of Floreal García; both of whom were professional footballers.

Career statistics
.

Notes

References

External links

2001 births
Living people
Sportspeople from San Miguel de Tucumán
Argentine footballers
Argentina youth international footballers
Association football forwards
Argentine Primera División players
Primera Nacional players
Club Atlético Vélez Sarsfield footballers
Club Atlético Platense footballers
Club Almirante Brown footballers